Basie Jam: Montreux '77 is a 1977 live album by Count Basie, recorded at the 1977 Montreux Jazz Festival.

Track listing 
 "Bookie Blues" (Count Basie, Ray Brown, Benny Carter, Vic Dickenson, Roy Eldridge, Al Grey, Zoot Sims, Jimmie Smith) – 14:48
 "She's Funny That Way" (Neil Moret, Richard A. Whiting) – 6:18
 "These Foolish Things (Remind Me of You)" (Holt Marvell, Jack Strachey) – 4:33
 "Kidney Stew" (Leona Blackman, Eddie Vinson) – 6:59
 "Trio Blues" (Count Basie) - 4:00
 "I Got It Bad (and That Ain't Good)" (Duke Ellington, Paul Francis Webster) – 3:56
 "Jumpin' at the Woodside" (Basie) – 4:31

Personnel 
 Count Basie - piano
 Benny Carter - alto saxophone
 Zoot Sims - tenor saxophone
 Vic Dickenson - trombone
 Roy Eldridge - trumpet
 Ray Brown - double bass
 Jimmie Smith - drums
 AL Grey - Ttombone

References 

Count Basie live albums
Albums recorded at the Montreux Jazz Festival
Albums produced by Norman Granz
1977 live albums
Pablo Records live albums